Crenicichla celidochilus is a species of cichlid native to South America. It is found in the Uruguay River drainage, in tributaries of the middle and upper Uruguay River basin.

References

Casciotta, J.R., 1987. Crenicichla celidochilus N. Sp. From Uruguay and a multivariate analysis of the lacustris Group (Perciformes, Cichlidae). Copeia 1987(4):883-891.

celidochilus
Fish of Uruguay
Taxa named by Jorge Rafael Casciotta
Fish described in 1987